Self-praise of Shulgi (Shulgi D) is a Sumerian myth, written on clay tablets dated to between 2100 and 2000 BC.

Compilation

The myth was discovered on the University of Pennsylvania Museum of Archaeology and Anthropology, catalogue of the Babylonian section (CBS), tablet number 11065 from their excavations at the temple library at Nippur. This was translated by George Aaron Barton in 1918 and first published as "Sumerian religious texts" in "Miscellaneous Babylonian Inscriptions", number three, entitled "Hymn to Dungi" (Dungi was later renamed to Shulgi). Barton noted that similar hymns were published by Stephen Herbert Langdon and  introduced into Sumerian religion at the time of the Third dynasty of Ur onwards. He dates the tablet to the reign of Shulgi, saying "The script of our tablets shows that this copy was made during the time of the First Dynasty of Babylon, but that does not preclude an earlier date for the composition of the original." Further tablets were used by Jacob Klein to expand and translate the myth again in 1981. He used several other tablets from the University Museum in Pennsylvania including CBS 8289. He also included translations from tablets in the Nippur collection of the Museum of the Ancient Orient in Istanbul, catalogue number 4571. He also used tabled 5379 from the Louvre in Paris.

Story

In the story, Shulgi is praised and compared to all manner of animals and wondrous things such as a tree.

His interactions and relationships with a large number of the pantheon of Sumerian gods are described along with victories in foreign lands and description of the royal barge.

Discussion

Samuel Noah Kramer suggests that Shulgi hymns speaking about the achievements of the king focussed on the two areas of social behaviour and religion. He is both shown to be concerned for social justice, law and equity along with being faithful in his priestly rites and interaction with the gods. He notes "uppermost in their minds was the Ekur, the holy temple of Nippur where virtually every king in the hymnal repertoire brought gifts, offerings, and sacrifices to Enlil."

See also
 Barton Cylinder
 Royal Correspondence of Ur
 Debate between Winter and Summer
 Debate between sheep and grain
 Enlil and Ninlil
 Old Babylonian oracle
 Hymn to Enlil
 Kesh temple hymn
 Lament for Ur
 Sumerian religion
 Sumerian literature

References

External links
 CDLI University Museum, University of Pennsylvania, Philadelphia, Pennsylvania, USA. Museum no.: CBS 11065
 Barton, George Aaron., Miscellaneous Babylonian Inscriptions, Yale University Press, 1918. Online Version
 ETCSL Self-praise of Shulgi (Shulgi D) - Bibliography
 ETCSL Self-praise of Shulgi (Shulgi D) - Translation
 ETCSL Self-praise of Shulgi (Shulgi D) - Composite Text

Sumerian texts
Clay tablets
Mesopotamian myths
Classical oracles
Religious cosmologies
Comparative mythology